Plamen Lipenski (born 30 March 1960) is a Bulgarian former football player, and currently manager/fitness coach. He was part of the Bulgarian national team.

Career

As a player 
Plamen Lipenski has 196 Appearances and scored 46 goals for Beroe Stara Zagora.

As a manager 
On 14 January 2013 Lipenski became the Fitness Coach of his youth club Beroe Stara Zagora and he was the head coach of the club between 7 April 2016 and 31 May 2016. He was victorious in his first game in charge of Beroe – a 3:1 win over Montana.  On 20 October 2016, following Aleksandar Dimitrov's resignation, Lipenski was appointed again as caretaker manager of Beroe Stara Zagora.

References 

1960 births
Living people
Bulgarian footballers
PFC Beroe Stara Zagora players
First Professional Football League (Bulgaria) players
Bulgarian expatriate footballers
Bulgaria international footballers
Sportspeople from Stara Zagora
Association football midfielders
Bulgarian football managers